Mounir Diane (born 16 May 1982) is a Moroccan former footballer who plays as an attacking midfielder for French amateur club CS Avion.

References

External links
 

1982 births
Living people
Association football midfielders
Moroccan footballers
Morocco international footballers
Moroccan expatriate footballers
RC Lens players
SC Bastia players
R.A.E.C. Mons players
Dubai CSC players
Al Rams Club players
Ras Al Khaimah Club players
Al Jazirah Al Hamra Club players
Khor Fakkan Sports Club players
Al-Nahda Club (Oman) players
CS Avion players
Expatriate footballers in France
Expatriate footballers in Belgium
Ligue 1 players
UAE Pro League players
UAE First Division League players
SC Douai players